Pulau Satumu (Chinese: 沙都姆岛) is a small island to the south of the main Singapore island, and the southernmost island of Singapore. The Raffles Lighthouse is located on the island. The island's name means "One Tree" in archaic Malay.

References

Islands of Singapore
Western Islands Planning Area